In geochemistry, geophysics and nuclear physics, primordial nuclides, also known as primordial isotopes, are nuclides found on Earth that have existed in their current form since before Earth was formed. Primordial nuclides were present in the interstellar medium from which the solar system was formed, and were formed in, or after, the Big Bang, by nucleosynthesis in stars and supernovae followed by mass ejection, by cosmic ray spallation, and potentially from other processes. They are the stable nuclides plus the long-lived fraction of radionuclides surviving in the primordial solar nebula through planet accretion until the present; 286 such nuclides are known.

Stability
All of the known 251 stable nuclides, plus another 35 nuclides that have half-lives long enough to have survived from the formation of the Earth, occur as primordial nuclides. These 35 primordial radionuclides represent isotopes of 28 separate elements.
Cadmium, tellurium, xenon, neodymium, samarium, osmium, and uranium each have two primordial radioisotopes (and).

For example, for a nuclide with half-life  (60 million years), this means 77 half-lives have elapsed, meaning that for each mole of that nuclide being present at the formation of Earth, only 4 atoms remain today.

These are the four nuclides with half-lives comparable to, or somewhat less than, the estimated age of the universe. (232Th has a half life slightly longer than the age of the universe.) For a complete list of the 35 known primordial radionuclides, including the next 30 with half-lives much longer than the age of the universe, see the complete list below. For practical purposes, nuclides with half-lives much longer than the age of the universe may be treated as if they were stable. 232Th and 238U have half-lives long enough that their decay is limited over geological time scales; 40K and 235U have shorter half-lives and are hence severely depleted, but are still long-lived enough to persist significantly in nature.

It has been reported to exist in nature as a primordial nuclide, although a later study did not detect it. Taking into account that all these nuclides must exist for at least , 244Pu must survive 57 half-lives (and hence be reduced by a factor of 257 ≈ ), 146Sm must survive 67 (and be reduced by 267 ≈ ), and 92Nb must survive 130 (and be reduced by 2130 ≈ ). Mathematically, considering the likely initial abundances of these nuclides, primordial 244Pu and 146Sm should persist somewhere within the Earth today, even if they are not identifiable in the relatively minor portion of the Earth's crust available to human assays, while 92Nb and all shorter-lived nuclides should not. Nuclides such as 92Nb that were present in the primordial solar nebula but have long since decayed away completely are termed extinct radionuclides if they have no other means of being regenerated.

Because primordial chemical elements often consist of more than one primordial isotope, there are only 83 distinct primordial chemical elements. Of these, 80 have at least one observationally stable isotope and three additional primordial elements have only radioactive isotopes (bismuth, thorium, and uranium).

Naturally occurring nuclides that are not primordial
Other examples of common naturally occurring but non-primordial nuclides are isotopes of radon, polonium, and radium, which are all radiogenic nuclide daughters of uranium decay and are found in uranium ores. The stable argon isotope 40Ar is actually more common as a radiogenic nuclide than as a primordial nuclide, forming almost 1% of the Earth's atmosphere, which is regenerated by the beta decay of the extremely long-lived radioactive primordial isotope 40K, whose half-life is on the order of a billion years and thus has been generating argon since early in the Earth's existence. (Primordial argon was dominated by the alpha process nuclide 36Ar, which is significantly rarer than 40Ar on Earth.)

A similar radiogenic series is derived from the long-lived radioactive primordial nuclide 232Th. These nuclides are described as geogenic, meaning that they are decay or fission products of uranium or other actinides in subsurface rocks. All such nuclides have shorter half-lives than their parent radioactive primordial nuclides. Some other geogenic nuclides do not occur in the decay chains of 232Th, 235U, or 238U but can still fleetingly occur naturally as products of the spontaneous fission of one of these three long-lived nuclides, such as 126Sn, which makes up about 10−14 of all natural tin.

Primordial elements 

A primordial element is a chemical element with at least one primordial nuclide. There are 251 stable primordial nuclides and 35 radioactive primordial nuclides, but only 80 primordial stable elements—hydrogen through lead, atomic numbers 1 to 82, with the exceptions of technetium (43) and promethium (61)—and three radioactive primordial elements—bismuth (83), thorium (90), and uranium (92). Bismuth's half-life is so long that it is often classed with the 80 primordial stable elements instead, since its radioactivity is not a cause for serious concern. The number of elements is smaller than the number of nuclides, because many of the primordial elements are represented by multiple isotopes. See chemical element for more information.

Naturally occurring stable nuclides 

As noted, these number about 251. For a list, see the article list of elements by stability of isotopes. For a complete list noting which of the "stable" 251 nuclides may be in some respect unstable, see list of nuclides and stable nuclide. These questions do not impact the question of whether a nuclide is primordial, since all "nearly stable" nuclides, with half-lives longer than the age of the universe, are also primordial.

Radioactive primordial nuclides
Although it is estimated that about 35 primordial nuclides are radioactive (list below), it becomes very difficult to determine the exact total number of radioactive primordials, because the total number of stable nuclides is uncertain. There exist many extremely long-lived nuclides whose half-lives are still unknown. Similarly, all four primordial isotopes of lead are expected to decay to mercury, but the predicted half-lives are so long (some exceeding 10100 years) that this can hardly be observed in the near future. Nevertheless, the number of nuclides with half-lives so long that they cannot be measured with present instruments—and are considered from this viewpoint to be stable nuclides—is limited. Even when a "stable" nuclide is found to be radioactive, it merely moves from the stable to the unstable list of primordial nuclides, and the total number of primordial nuclides remains unchanged. For practical purposes, these nuclides may be considered stable for all purposes outside specialized research.

List of 35 radioactive primordial nuclides and measured half-lives
These 35 primordial nuclides represent radioisotopes of 28 distinct chemical elements (cadmium, neodymium, osmium, samarium, tellurium, uranium, and xenon each have two primordial radioisotopes). The radionuclides are listed in order of stability, with the longest half-life beginning the list. These radionuclides in many cases are so nearly stable that they compete for abundance with stable isotopes of their respective elements. 
For three chemical elements, indium, tellurium, and rhenium, a very long-lived radioactive primordial nuclide is found in greater abundance than a stable nuclide.

Only four of these 35 nuclides have half-lives shorter than, or equal to, the age of the universe. Most of the remaining 30 have half-lives much longer. The shortest-lived primordial isotope, 235U, has a half-life of 703.8 million years, about one sixth of the age of the Earth and the Solar System. Many of these nuclides decay by double beta decay, although some like 209Bi decay by other methods such as alpha decay.

At the end of the list, two more nuclides have been added: 244Pu and 146Sm. They have not been confirmed as primordial, but their half-lives are long enough that minute quantities should persist today.

List legends

See also 
 Alpha nuclide
 Table of nuclides sorted by half-life
 Table of nuclides
 Isotope geochemistry
 Radionuclide
 Mononuclidic element
 Monoisotopic element
 Stable isotope
 List of nuclides
 List of elements by stability of isotopes
 Big Bang nucleosynthesis

References

Geochemistry
Radiometric dating
Isotopes
Metrology